Templederry Kenyons GAA is a Tipperary GAA club which is located in County Tipperary, Ireland. Both hurling and Gaelic football are played in the "North-Tipperary" divisional competitions. The club is centred on the village of Templederry.

History
Templederry affiliated as a club in 1887 with FR J. Frost C.C. and James Coughlan of Latteragh the leading organisers. However, from 1906 to the end of the 1920s the club had very little success. In 1931, a re-united Templederry parish team reached the North Tipperary Intermediate hurling final for the first time and had a comprehensive 7–4 to 3–3 victory over Roscrea. Templederry then went up to Senior but were unable to make the breakthrough and returned to Intermediate ranks in the late 1930s. In 1998, Templederry won its first Juvenile County title, defeating Upperchurch/Drombane in the U12 C Hurling final. The North Junior B league was also won that year at the expense of Borrisokane. In 2008, Templederry won the North and County Intermediate finals at the expense of Newport. 0–17 to 1-10 was the score in the North decider while the county final finished 0–15 to 0–9.

Honours
 Seamus O Riain Cup Winners: 2021
 Tipperary Intermediate Hurling Championship Winners: 2000, 2008
 North Tipperary Intermediate Hurling Championship: 1931, 1979, 2000, 2008
 North Tipperary Junior A Hurling Championship (3) 1970, 1976, 1977
 Tipperary Junior B Hurling Championship (2) 1996, 2009
 North Tipperary Junior B Hurling Championship (4) 1996, 2002, 2009, 2013
 North Tipperary Junior B Football Championship (1) 2008
 North Tipperary Under-21 A Hurling Championship (2) 1977, 2008
 Tipperary Under-21 B Hurling Championship (2) 2001, 2005
 North Tipperary Under-21 B Hurling Championship (5) 1984, 2001, 2005, 2007, 2016 (with Ballinahinch)
 North Tipperary Minor A Hurling Championship (1) 1933
 Tipperary Minor B Hurling Championship (3) 1996, 2000, 2001
 North Tipperary Minor B Hurling Championship (3) 1996, 2000, 2001

Notable players
 Adrian Ryan
 Gearóid Ryan
 Micheál Ryan
 Thomas Stapleton

References

External links 
Official web site
Tipperary GAA site

Gaelic games clubs in County Tipperary
Hurling clubs in County Tipperary